Mixed traffic is a term that may refer to:
A mixed-traffic locomotive
A street running train, often said to be "running in mixed traffic"